This is a list of Nordic Council's Literature Prize winners and nominees. The first prize was awarded in 1962.

References

External links 
http://www.norden.org/en/nordic-council/nordic-council-prizes/nordisk-raads-litteraturpris/media/nominerede-1962-2013

Nordic literary awards